St. Anne's School Mazagaon Mumbai may refer to:
 St. Anne's High School, Bandra, Mumbai, India
 St. Anne's High School, Orlem, Mumbai, India
St. Anne's High School, Fort, Mumbai, India (Convent of Jesus and Mary)
 St. Anne's High School, Bangalore, India
 St. Anne's High School, Bangalore, India
 St. Anne's Convent School
 St. Anne's High School, Bangalore, India
 St. Anne's High School, South Africa, Rustenburg, Bapong 2
 st. Anne's High School, Patna City
 St. Anne's Girls Higher Secondary School, Chepet, Thiruvannamalai District, India

See also
 Saint Anne's School (disambiguation)